The Wright Brothers Mule Barn, also known as Rader Packing Co. Bldg. and Diggs Building, is a historic structure built by L.W. and B.C. Wright located at Columbia, Missouri.  It is located in an industrial area north of Downtown Columbia, Missouri. The 1 1/2-story masonry building was Mid-Missouri's leading mule facility in the 1920s. Today the building has been restored and renovated and offices and lofts.

The property was added to the National Register of Historic Places in 2007.

References

External links
Fay Street Lofts

Barns on the National Register of Historic Places in Missouri
National Register of Historic Places in Boone County, Missouri
Office buildings in Columbia, Missouri
Apartment buildings in Columbia, Missouri